The 1932 Iowa Senate elections took place as part of the biennial 1932 United States elections. Iowa voters elected state senators in 30 of the senate's 50 districts. State senators serve four-year terms in the Iowa Senate.

A statewide map of the 50 state Senate districts in the 1932 elections is provided by the Iowa General Assembly here.

The primary election on June 6, 1932 determined which candidates appeared on the November 8, 1932 general election ballot.

Following the previous election, Republicans had control of the Iowa Senate with 44 seats to Democrats' 6 seats.

To claim control of the chamber from Republicans, the Democrats needed to net 20 Senate seats.

The Democrats gained control of the Iowa Senate following the 1932 general election with the balance of power shifting to Republicans and Democrats having 25 seats each (a net gain of 19 seats for Democrats). Lieutenant Governor of Iowa Nelson G. Kraschel was a Democrat and presided over the evenly-divided Iowa Senate following the election.

In 1932, after winning her election in the twenty-third senatorial district, Carolyn Campbell Pendray became the first woman elected to the Iowa Senate. Previously, she had been the first woman elected to the Iowa House of Representatives as well.

Summary of Results
Note: 19 districts with holdover Senators not up for re-election are not listed on this table.

Source:

Detailed Results
NOTE: The 20 districts that did not hold elections in 1932 are not listed here.

Note: If a district does not list a primary, then that district did not have a competitive primary (i.e., there may have only been one candidate file for that district).

District 2

District 3

District 4

District 5

District 6

District 8

District 11

District 14

District 15

District 16

District 17

District 19

District 23

District 24

District 25

District 26

District 27

District 28

District 31

District 32

District 33

District 36

District 39

District 40

District 41

District 43

District 46

District 47

District 48

District 49

See also
 United States elections, 1932
 United States House of Representatives elections in Iowa, 1932
 Elections in Iowa

References

1932 Iowa elections
Iowa Senate
Iowa Senate elections